AllthePigs Theatre Company is an independent theatre company based in London. Their stated mission is to "showcase the hidden gems of the past, champion up-and-coming playwrights, and give both the platform to shine".

History
AllthePigs were formed by Ami Stidolph and Sam Carrack upon graduating the Oxford School of Drama.

The company's first plays were written by first time writers, and were presented at the Hen and Chickens Theatre and played alongside Isabelle Wright's Peepshow.

Previous productions

First Time Writers Initiative
Running from the beginning the First Time Writers Initiative was set up by the AllthePigs and selects individuals who have never had a play professionally produced before and takes them on a 16-week intensive course of workshops, readings and rehearsals, eventually creating a 30-minute play, and pairing them up with an up-and-coming director.

Each short play then runs alongside a published production as selected by AllthePigs.

From 2010-2012 each writer had two performances of their play. In 2013, each writer had a full week of performances.

"This process appears to be an effective one, judging by the high quality of dialogue and characterisation"

Awards
 Peepshow and AGM received a commendation by the National Student Drama Festival and Spotlight Emerging Artists’ Award at the Hen and Chickens Theatre.
 Recipients of Old Vic New Voices Start Up Fund in 2011.

References

External links
 Official website
 New Diorama Theatre official homepage

Theatre companies in London